Escadrille SPA.48 was a unit of the French Air Force during World War I.

Unit history
Escadrille 48 was created on 29 March 1915 at Villacoublay near Paris, flying the Morane-Saulnier L. Active throughout the war at various locations on the Western Front, the escadrille replaced its aircraft with Nieuports in early 1915, then with SPADs at the end of 1916. By 11 November 1918 the pilots of the escadrille had logged 9,826 flying hours, with 54 confirmed and 48 probable victories, at a cost of 11 killed and 12 wounded.

Commanders

Notable members
 Albert Achard (3 April – 29 September 1915)
 René Dousinelle (13 April 1917 – October 1918)
 Gilbert de Guingand (22 April 1917 – 22 October 1918)
 Auguste Lahoulle (19 May 1916 – 4 January 1917 & 16 October 1917 – January 1918)
 René Montrion (6 April 1917 – 28 June 1918)
 Jean Navarre (1 – 24 February 1916)
 Jacques Roques (2 January 1917 – November 1918)
 Armand de Turenne (13 June 1916 – 12 January 1918)
 Edmond Caillaux (18 February 1896 – 22 January 1943)

Aircraft flown
The following aircraft were operated by the unit between 1915 and 1918.
 Morane-Saulnier L
 Nieuport 10
 Nieuport 12
 Nieuport 11
 Nieuport 17 (& 23)
 SPAD S.VII

References

Bibliography

Further reading
 
 

 

French Air and Space Force squadrons